The Open Ribera de Duero was a golf tournament on the Challenge Tour, played in Spain. It was held in 1993 at Lerma Golf Club in Madrid.

Winners

References

External links
Coverage on the Challenge Tour's official site

Former Challenge Tour events
Golf tournaments in Spain
1993 in Spanish sport